In geotechnical engineering and contact mechanics the term asperity is used to refer to individual features of unevenness (roughness) of the surface of a discontinuity, grain, or particle with heights in the range from approximately 0.1 mm to the order of metres. Below the asperity level, surface interactions are normally considered to be a material property, arising from mechanisms of adhesion and repulsion at the atomic scale (often accounted for by material friction, atomic friction or molecular friction).

Dilation

An often used definition for asperities in geotechnical engineering:
Unevenness of a surface are asperities if these cause dilation if two blocks with in between a discontinuity with matching asperities on the two opposing surfaces (i.e. a fitting discontinuity) move relative to each other, under low stress levels that do not cause breaking of the asperities.

Contrast with asperity in materials science

Materials science recognizes asperities ranging from the sub-visual (normally less than 0.1 mm) to the atomic scale.

See also
 Discontinuity (Geotechnical engineering)
 Geotechnical engineering
 Rock mechanics
 Soil mechanics

References

Further reading
 

 

Building stone
Soil mechanics
Natural materials
Pavements
Road construction